Mary L. "Nora" Disis is an American physician-oncologist and the editor in chief of JAMA Oncology.

She was part of the scientific team who discovered that the HER2/neu molecule is a tumor-specific marker, or antigen.

Career 
Disis is an oncologist and the director of the University of Washington's Cancer Vaccine Institute, Center for Translational Medicine in Women's Health and its Institute of Translational Health Science. 

She is the associate dean of the University of Washington's School of Medicine, the dean of Research and Graduate Education, the associate dean of Translational Science, the Helen B. Slonaker Endowed Professor for Cancer Research, a professor of Medicine and Oncology, and an adjunct professor of Obstetrics & Gynecology and Pathology. 

She is an investigator at the Fred Hutchinson Cancer Research Center and  an expert in immunology and the immunotherapy of both ovarian and breast cancers. She was part of the investigative team who discovered that the HER2/neu molecule is a tumor-specific marker, or antigen.

She is the founding editor in chief of JAMA Oncology.

Selected publications 

 Pathangey LB, McCurry DB, Gendler SJ, Dominguez AL, Gorman JE, Pathangey G, Mihalik LA, Dang Y, Disis ML, Cohen PA. Surrogate in vitro activation of innate immunity synergizes with interleukin-7 to unleash rapid antigen-driven outgrowth of CD4+ and CD8+ human peripheral blood T-cells naturally recognizing MUC1, HER2/neu and other tumor-associated antigens. Oncotarget. 2017 Feb 14;8(7):10785-10808. doi: 10.18632/oncotarget.13911. PMID: 27974697; PMCID: PMC5355224.

References 

Living people

Year of birth missing (living people)

American women physicians

Medical journal editors
American oncologists
Cancer researchers
Women oncologists
Fred Hutchinson Cancer Research Center people
American university and college faculty deans
Women deans (academic)
University of Washington staff